This is a list of governors for Halland County of Sweden, from 1658 to present.

 Bengt Christoffersson Lilliehöök (1658–1665)
 Johan Hård af Segerstad (1665–1676)
 Göran Sperling (1676–1678)
 Sven Ranck (1678–1684)
 Gustaf Tungel (1684–1694)
 Hans von Dellingshausen (1698–1705)
 Reinhold Johan von Fersen (1695–1710)
 Axel von Faltzburg (1710–1728)
 Wilhelm Bennet (1728–1737)
 Claes Rålamb (1737–1745)
 Carl Mårten Fleetwood (1745–1750)
 Nils Bonde (1750)
 Hans Hummelhielm (1750–1761)
 Arvid Silfvershiöld (1761–1771)
 Olof von Nackreij (1771–1776)
 Salomon von Otter (1776–1781)
 Georg Gustaf Wrangel (1781–1793)
 Axel Eric Gyllenstierna (1793–1810)
 Gustaf Wilhelm Conradi (1810–1812)
 Josua Sylvander (1812–1818)
 Lars Arnell (1818–1823)
 Claes Virgin (1824–1844)
 Patrick Adolph Lewenhaupt (1844–1860)
 Carl Jonas Oscar Alströmer (1860–1876)
 F W Leijonancker (1876–1883)
 Carl Nordenfalk (1883–1902)
 Axel Asker (1902–1916)
 Carl Fredrik Hederstierna (1916–1920)
 Axel Mörner (1920–1935)
 Hilding Kjellman (1935–1943)
 Reimer Johansson (1943–1959)
 Ingvar Lindell (1959–1971)
 Yngve Holmberg (1972–1977)
 Carl Persson (1978–1979)
 Johannes Antonsson (1979–1986)
 Björn Molin (1986–1997)
 Karin Starrin (1997–2004)
 Lars-Erik Lövdén (2005–2014)
 Lena Sommestad (2014–2020)
 Jörgen Peters (acting; 2020–2020)
 Brittis Benzler (2020–2023)

Footnotes

References

Halland